Hamza Ounnas (born 18 December 1988) is an Algerian footballer who plays as a midfielder for US Biskra in the Algerian Ligue Professionnelle 1.

References

External links

1988 births
Living people
Association football midfielders
Algerian footballers
USM Annaba players
NA Hussein Dey players
USM Blida players
JSM Béjaïa players
DRB Tadjenanet players
USM Bel Abbès players
21st-century Algerian people